Rishijae Mudgal (born 8 April 1972) is an Indian former cricketer who played as a right-handed batter. She appeared in two Test matches and six One Day Internationals for India in 1995. She played domestic cricket for Delhi and Air India.

References

External links
 
 

Living people
1972 births
Cricketers from Delhi
Indian women cricketers
India women Test cricketers
India women One Day International cricketers
Delhi women cricketers
Air India women cricketers